Peltops is a genus of birds in the family Artamidae. It contains two species that are endemic to the island of New Guinea. The species have also had the common name of shieldbill.

Taxonomy
The genus Peltops was introduced by the German zoologist Johann Georg Wagler in 1829. The type species is the lowland peltops.  The name is from the Greek pelte meaning small shield and ops meaning face. The genus was once placed with the monarch flycatchers, but molecular and morphometric studies place it closer to the butcherbirds, possibly as a sister taxon to this group. The genus is placed in its own subfamily, Peltopsinae.

The genus contains two species:

Description
Peltops are smaller than the butcherbirds, and have a less massive but still large bill. The hooked bill is the same size in both species, making it proportionally larger in the lowland peltops.

Distribution and habitat
Both species occupy rainforest on New Guinea, but are separated by altitude. Within the forest they are particularly common at forest openings and edges, tree falls, river edges, and other disturbed areas including human modified openings like roads and gardens. In undisturbed virgin forest they may use massive trees emerging from and above the canopy.

References

 
Bird genera
Cracticidae
Taxonomy articles created by Polbot